Quantum volume is a metric that measures the capabilities and error rates of a quantum computer. It expresses the maximum size of square quantum circuits that can be implemented successfully by the computer. The form of the circuits is independent from the quantum computer architecture, but compiler can transform and optimize it to take advantage of the computer's features. Thus, quantum volumes for different architectures can be compared.

In 2020, the highest achieved quantum volume (per ) rose from 32 for IBM's computer "Raleigh" to 128 for Honeywell's "H1", i.e. quantum circuits of size up to 7×7 have been implemented successfully. Since then, the record for highest quantum volume as of February 2023 has risen to 32,768 (15×15),  for Quantinuum's H1 Ion trap quantum computer.

Introduction
Quantum computers are difficult to compare. Quantum volume is a single number designed to show all around performance. It is a measurement and not a calculation, and takes into account several features of a quantum computer, starting with its number of qubits—other measures used are gate and measurement errors, crosstalk and connectivity.

IBM defined its Quantum Volume metric  because a classical computer's transistor count and a quantum computer's quantum bit count aren't the same. Qubits decohere with a resulting loss of performance so a few fault tolerant bits are more valuable as a performance measure than a larger number of  noisy, error-prone qubits.

Generally, the larger the quantum volume, the more complex the problems a quantum computer can solve.

Definition

Original Definition
The quantum volume of a quantum computer was originally defined in 2018 by Nikolaj Moll et al. However, since around 2021 that definition has been supplanted by IBM's 2019 redefinition.
The original definition depends on the number of qubits N as well as the number of steps that can be executed, the circuit depth d

The circuit depth depends on the effective error rate  as

The effective error rate  is defined as the average error rate of a two-qubit gate. If more complex hardware gates are available, such as the three-qubit Toffoli gate, it is possible that .

The allowable circuit depth decreases when more qubits with the same effective error rate are added. To run an algorithm that only requires  qubits on an N-qubit machine, it could be beneficial to select a subset of qubits with good connectivity. For this case, Moll et al.  give a refined definition of quantum volume.

where the maximum is taken over an arbitrary choice of n qubits.

IBM's redefinition
In 2019, IBM's researchers modified the quantum volume definition to be an exponential of the circuit size, stating that it corresponds to the complexity of simulating the circuit on a classical computer:

Algorithmic Qubits (AQ)

Algorithmic Qubits, introduced by IonQ, is an alternative metric. However, the algorithm used for the test does not rest on rigorous complexity grounds and is subject to compiler tricks such as post-processing. To date, no detailed studies or justifications for the metric have been published in peer reviewed literature.

IonQ announced a #AQ = 20, meaning they passed the test with 20 qubits. Note, this does not imply 20 qubits were faithfully entangled as the post-processing component of the test obfuscates what the test is actually measuring.

Achievement history

See also
 Noisy intermediate-scale quantum era
 Quantum fidelity

Notes

References

Quantum information science
Quantum computing
Models of computation